Jakov Mustapić (born August 22, 1994) is a Croatian professional basketball player currently playing for Cedevita Junior of the Croatian League. Standing at 1.93 m, he plays at the guard positions.

Professional career 
Mustapić played for the youth system of his hometown club Cedevita. He started his professional career in the same club, but was  loaned twice: once to Zabok and once to Kvarner 2010. After the second loan his contract with Cedevita was terminated and he spent the next three seasons playing in the Croatian League for Split, Jolly and Vrijednosnice Osijek. The 2017–18 season he spent for the first time abroad in Miasto Szkła Krosno of the Polish League.  

In October 2018, he returned to Vrijednosnice Osijek, but spent only a month there before returning to his youth club Cedevita. 

On June 21, 2019, he has signed a deal with Wilki Morskie Szczecin of the Polish League.

In February, 2020, Mustapić signed with Igokea of the Bosnian League and the ABA League. 

In March, 2021, Mustapić signed for Cibona of the Croatian League and ABA League. He averaged 5.1 points and 3.3 rebounds per game. On February 1, 2022, Mustapić signed with Spars Ilidža of the Championship of Bosnia and Herzegovina and the Second ABA League.

In August 2022, Mustapić signed for Cedevita Junior of the Croatian League.

Personal life
He is the son of Ivan Mustapić, Croatian record-holding javelin thrower and the nephew of Tihomir Mustapić, a basketball player, but also a javelin thrower that holds the second-best Croatian result. Tihomir went on to be an assistant coach at Zrinjski Mostar. His other uncle is Dragan Mustapić, a former discus thrower.

References

External links
 RealGM Profile
 fiba.com Profile

1994 births
Living people
ABA League players
Croatian men's basketball players
Guards (basketball)
KK Cedevita players
KK Igokea players
KK Split players
Basketball players from Zagreb
KK Zabok players
OKK Sloboda Tuzla players
OKK Spars players
KK Cibona players
KKK MOSiR Krosno players
KK Kvarner 2010 players
KK Vrijednosnice Osijek players
KK Cedevita Junior players